No-Name Island is a  alluvial island in the upper Allegheny River.  It is located in Tionesta Township, Forest County, Pennsylvania, and is part of the Allegheny Islands Wilderness.

The island is a prime location for old growth, virgin, and river bottom forests.

References
Nature Tourism

Allegheny Islands Wilderness
Protected areas of Forest County, Pennsylvania
Landforms of Forest County, Pennsylvania
River islands of Pennsylvania